Gliese 829 is a double-lined spectroscopic binary system of two red dwarf stars in the constellation of Pegasus. They have a high proper motion of 1.08 arc seconds per year along a position angle of +69.58°. Based upon parallax measurements, the stars are at a distance of about 22 light years from the Sun.

Characteristics 
The primary star has a temp of 3400 K. It is an M3.0Ve star with a B-V color index of 1.61 and it is also called Ross 775. It has an app. mag. of 10.35.

References

0829
Pegasus (constellation)
106106
Spectroscopic binaries
106106